Salomon Zeldenrust (17 February 1884 – 20 July 1958) was a Dutch épée, foil and sabre fencer. He won a bronze medal in the team sabre event at the 1920 Summer Olympics.

References

External links
 

1884 births
1958 deaths
Dutch male épée fencers
Olympic fencers of the Netherlands
Fencers at the 1920 Summer Olympics
Olympic bronze medalists for the Netherlands
Olympic medalists in fencing
Fencers from Amsterdam
Medalists at the 1920 Summer Olympics
Dutch male foil fencers
Dutch male sabre fencers
20th-century Dutch people